Exchange of Wives is a 1925 American comedy drama film directed by Hobart Henley, with screenplay by Fanny Hatton based upon a Broadway play by Cosmo Hamilton. The film stars Eleanor Boardman, Renée Adorée, Lew Cody, and Creighton Hale.

Plot
As described in a film magazine review, a serious young man and his emotional wife become acquainted with a frivolous young man and his serious minded wife, and it is not long before like attracts like, to the discomfiture of all. The four agree to an exchange of wives during a trip into the mountains, with the result that each is soon glad to go back to the original marital arrangement.

Cast

Preservation
Prints of Exchange of Wives are held at Archives Du Film Du CNC (Bois d'Arcy) and by MGM.

References

External links

Postcard at silentfilmstillarchive.com

1925 films
Films directed by Hobart Henley
Metro-Goldwyn-Mayer films
American silent feature films
1925 drama films
American black-and-white films
American drama films
1920s American films
Silent American drama films